Charles Burgess Fry (25 April 1872 – 7 September 1956) was an English sportsman, teacher, writer, editor and publisher, who is best remembered for his career as a cricketer. John Arlott described him with the words: "Charles Fry could be autocratic, angry and self-willed: he was also magnanimous, extravagant, generous, elegant, brilliant – and fun ... he was probably the most variously gifted Englishman of any age."

Fry's achievements on the sporting field included representing England at both cricket and football, an FA Cup Final appearance for Southampton F.C. and equalling the then-world record for the long jump. He also reputedly turned down the throne of Albania. In later life, he suffered mental health problems, but even well into his seventies he claimed he was still able to perform his party trick: leaping from a stationary position backwards onto a mantelpiece.

Education
C. B. Fry was born in Croydon; the son of a civil servant. Both sides of his family had once been wealthy, but by 1872 were not as prosperous. After winning a scholarship, Fry was educated at Repton School and then at Wadham College, Oxford. His greatest strength academically was in the Classics. At Repton he won the school prizes for Latin Verse, Greek Verse, Latin Prose and French. He was also runner-up in German. His weakest subject was mathematics; he gained the headmaster's permission to study Thucydides instead and dispensed with maths for the rest of his academic career.

Repton has a strong tradition in football and Fry played for the under-16 Repton football side in his first term, aged thirteen. He went on to captain both the school's cricket and football teams, and also won prizes for athletics. At the age of sixteen he played for the Casuals in the F.A. Cup.

Having won a further scholarship to study at Wadham College, Oxford, he won his university Blue in football, cricket and athletics, but narrowly failed to win a Blue in rugby union, because of an injury. Fry's status brought him into the orbit of people whose fame was already spreading far beyond Oxford, such as Max Beerbohm, the writer and caricaturist. He gained a first in classical moderations.

When Fry was only twenty-one, the magazine Vanity Fair published a caricature of him in its issue of 19 April 1894, with the comment: "He is sometimes known as "C.B."; but it has lately been suggested that he should be called 'Charles III'."

In his final term at Oxford Fry experienced his first (but not last) bout of mental illness, suffering a mental breakdown. There were a number of contributing factors to this. During his time at Oxford Fry had accumulated disturbingly large debts. In an attempt to alleviate his financial difficulties, Fry capitalised on his reputation to make some much-needed money. As well as writing articles (including one for Wisden), he did some private tutoring but although such activities reduced his debts they did not clear them and, further increased the intense pressure on his time. Fry's continuing indebtedness provides the most obvious explanation for his acceptance of an offer to do some nude modelling. These financial problems combined with his mother being seriously ill, placed an unbearable strain on him. Although he was able to sit his final exams, he was hardly in any fit state to do so, having hardly read a line for weeks. The result was Fry scraping a Fourth, bringing one of Oxford's most spectacular and successful careers to an inglorious end. So in the summer of 1895, only months after being the toast of Oxford, Fry found himself saddled with mounting debts and no way with which to repay them. In the short term, cricket came to his rescue. He was offered, and accepted, the chance to tour South Africa as a member of Lord Hawke's 1895–96 England touring party.

Personal life
In 1898, Fry married Beatrice Holme Sumner (1862–1946), daughter of Arthur Holme Sumner, of Hatchlands Park, Guildford, Surrey; they had three children. Beatrice was ten years Fry's senior, and known for her 'fiery, strong-willed, aggressive' personality; she was reckoned to be 'a cruel and domineering woman', and Fry 'lived in fear of her for the duration of their marriage', as 'she made him thoroughly miserable and he tried to stay away from her as much as possible'. His unhappy marriage impacted Fry's mental health; his daughter-in-law observed: 'I should think anyone would have a breakdown married to her". At Beatrice's death, they had been married for 48 years; Fry 'adjusted to her death with great equanimity and even her children showed all the freedom of the newly liberated'. In 1984, their son Stephen said: 'My mother ruined my father's life'. He and his son, Charles Fry, also played first-class cricket.

Sporting career
Apart from his other sporting achievements stated below, Fry was also a decent shot putter, hammer thrower and ice skater, representing Wadham in the inter-College races on Blenheim lake in the winter of 1894–95 and coming close to an unofficial Blue as a member of the Oxford team who took on Cambridge on the Fens, as well as being a proficient golfer.

Cricket
Fry played for Surrey in 1891 (but not in any first-class fixtures), Oxford University 1892–1895 (winning Blues in all four years and captaining the university in 1894, meaning that he was simultaneously not only captain of both the university cricket and football teams but president of the varsity athletics club as well) Sussex 1894–1908 (captain 1904–1908), and Hampshire, 1909–1921. First selected by England for the tour of South Africa in 1895–96, he captained England in his final six Test matches in 1912, winning four and drawing two. He twice scored Test centuries: 144 v Australia in 1905 hitting 23 fours in just over  hours, batting at number four, and 129 opening the batting against South Africa in 1907.

As a highly effective right-handed batsman who batted at, or near the top of the order, Fry scored 30,886 first-class runs at an average of 50.22, a particularly high figure for an era when scores were generally lower than today. At the end of his cricketing career in 1921–22, he had the second highest average of any retired player with over 10,000 runs: only his Sussex and England colleague Ranjitsinhji had retired with a better career average. He headed the batting averages (qualification minimum 20 innings) for six English seasons (in 1901, 1903, 1905, 1907, 1911 and 1912). Against Yorkshire, the strongest county bowling attack of Fry's time, he averaged a remarkable 63.60 over the course of his career, including back to back scores of 177 and 229 against them in 1904. GL Jessop said that calmness was at the heart of his batting and that he was a superb judge of a run as well as being fast between the wickets.

In his early career Fry was an enthusiastic and successful right-arm fast-medium bowler. He returned his career best figures of 6–78 in the 1895 Varsity match, and he twice took ten wickets in a match: 5–75 and 5–102 for the Gentlemen of England against I Zingari in 1895, and 5–81 and 5–66 for Sussex against Nottinghamshire in 1896 (a match in which he also scored 89 and 65). The late 1890s saw a re-emergence of the throwing controversy in cricket. Several professional bowlers including Arthur Mold and Ernie Jones were no-balled and forced to retire. Fry's bowling action was criticised by opponents and teammates, and it was only a matter of time before he too was no-balled by umpire Jim Phillips.

Fry scored 94 first-class centuries, including an unprecedented six consecutive centuries in 1901. No one else has scored more consecutive hundreds. On 12 September 1901, playing for the Rest of England against Yorkshire at Lord's, he scored 105, which was his sixth consecutive first-class century. He made his highest first-class score of 258 not out in 1911, a season which led to his recall to the England Test team as captain in 1912. In 1921 Fry was once again considered for the Test side. The Selection Committee asked him to play in the First Test match at Nottingham under the captaincy of Johnny Douglas, with a view to taking over the captaincy for the remainder of the series if, as they anticipated, things went wrong. Fry declined on the basis that there was no sense in recalling a forty-nine-year-old merely as a player, but stated that he would consider returning as captain. As England were badly beaten at Nottingham the Selection Committee again pressed Fry to return for the Second Test but once again he declined, due to poor form. Following another heavy defeat in the Second Test the Selection Committee made a further attempt to persuade Fry to return for the Third Test as captain, a job he was now keen to accept. He injured a finger taking a catch during Hampshire's match with the Australians. In the short term, the injury did not appear too serious: he scored a half-century in Hampshire's first innings and, when they followed on in reply to the Australians' massive total he top scored with 37. Furthermore, in his next match against Nottinghamshire he scored 61 in the first innings (but registered a duck in the second). It appears however that the injury was affecting his fielding more than his batting and, for last time, C.B. felt obliged to stand down from the side for the next Test. Fry later commentated on cricket matches, being called "one of the most eloquent cricket commentators of all time."

For both Sussex and England, he was closely associated with the outstanding cricketer Prince Ranjitsinhji, the future Jam Sahib of Nawanagar. Their contrasting batting styles complemented one another (Fry being an orthodox, technically correct batsman, and Ranji being noted for his innovation, particularly his use of the leg glance). Their friendship lasted well into the 1920s, and when Ranjitsinhji became one of India's three representatives at the League of Nations, he took Fry with him as his assistant.

Athletics
In athletics, Fry won Blues in all four years at Oxford 1892–95, representing the university against Cambridge in the long jump in 1892, 1893, 1894 and 1895; the high jump in 1892 and the 100 yards in 1893 and 1894. This is often incorrectly claimed to have stood as a world record for 21 years, but this length of time actually only refers to how long he held the university record, Cambridge's H. S. O. Ashington adding three-quarters of an inch to Fry's distance in 1913. Fry's shared world record was broken on 5 September 1894 by Ireland's J. J. Mooney.

In the first contest between universities from different countries, Oxford v Yale at the Queen's Club, West Kensington, in 1894, Fry came third in the long jump and won the 100 yards. In addition to being an outstanding long jumper, sprinter and high jumper, Fry was also a talented hurdler, once competing against Godfrey Shaw the champion hurdler of the time, who beat him but told him, as Fry later recalled: "He was sure if I took up hurdling seriously I might win the championship." Fry was also president of the Oxford University athletics club in 1894.

Football

Fry's achievements extended to association football.

A defender with exceptional pace, Fry learned his football at Repton School, where he played for and captained the school team. While still at school he also played for the famous amateur club the Casuals, for whom he found himself turning out in an FA Cup tie at the age of sixteen. Fry went on to win Blues in each of his four years at Oxford University captaining the side in his third year. In 1891, he joined another famous amateur club, the Corinthians, going on to make a total of 74 appearances for them between 1891 and 1903 scoring four goals. Although extremely proud of his amateur status, he decided that entering the professional game would enhance his chance of international honours. He chose Southampton F.C. (The Saints), as the leading lights in the Southern League, and also because The Dell was conveniently close to his home. He made his debut for Southampton (as an amateur) on 26 December 1900,against Tottenham Hotspur and went on to help them win the Southern League title during that 1900–01 season.

Fry's game was probably a little too refined for the hurly-burly of professional football, he never relished the aerial challenges that were more prevalent in the professional game, but having worked tirelessly to improve his heading ability he achieved his aim of international honours when (along with Southampton's goalkeeper, Jack Robinson), he was picked to play as a full-back for England in the match against Ireland on 9 March 1901 (played in Southampton).

The following season (1901–02), Southampton reached the FA Cup Final, playing against Sheffield United, which was drawn 1–1, but Southampton lost the replay, 2–1. Although he had moments during the cup run in which he excelled, his positional play was sometimes questioned. Fry played in all eight of the FA Cup games for Southampton that season, but in only nine Southern League matches, with Bill Henderson being forced to give way whenever Fry was available. The following season, he played twice at centre forward, without success, but Southampton released him partly due to his lack of availability. Fry made 25 first-team appearances for Southampton. He then joined Southampton's local rivals Portsmouth, making his debut for them on 21 January 1903. Fry made three appearances for Portsmouth (as an amateur) before retiring from football due to injury.

Rugby union

Fry played rugby union for Oxford University, narrowly missing out on a Blue in his final year due to injury, Blackheath, for whom he made ten appearances, and the Barbarians, for whom he made three appearances. Fry was also chosen, as he later recalled, as the "first reserve for the South against the North" – a match that was, in effect, an England trial. Unfortunately for Fry, no one pulled out before the match and, as there were no substitutions allowed in rugby at the time, he did not get to play.

Acrobatics
Fry's party trick was to leap from a stationary position on the floor backwards onto a mantelpiece; he would face the mantelpiece, crouch down, take a leap upwards, turn in the air, and bow to the gallery with his feet planted on the shelf. Persuasion would occasionally get him to perform this turn at country houses, much to the interest of the guests.

Career outside sport

Teaching
In 1896 Fry took up a teaching position at Charterhouse. Two years later in 1898 he left the profession, moving on to a successful and much more lucrative and less time-consuming career in journalism. He later recalled: "I could earn by journalism three times the income for the expenditure of a tenth of the time." In December 1908 he became the Captain Superintendent of the Training Ship Mercury, a nautical school primarily designed to prepare boys for service in the Royal Navy; this was run by his wife Beatrice from 1885 to 1946, she having founded the school with her lover (and father of her illegitimate children), the rich banker Charles Hoare. She subjected the boys, 'hounded from morn to night', to 'barbarities' including ceremonial floggings of extreme violence and forced boxing matches inflicted as punishment. Fry held this position until he resigned to make way for a younger man in 1950. Eventually he was given the rank of captain in the Royal Naval Reserve (RNR). Alan Gibson wrote: "He ... would stride about in his uniform looking, as I think it was Robertson-Glasgow who said, every inch like six admirals." Interviewed about the Mercury, and his role in its development, he was addressed as 'Commander C. B. Fry'.

Politics

As far back as his time at Wadham College, Fry had been interested in politics, but admitted: "I take a great interest in heaps of things that I know nothing about ... politics for one".

In 1920 when his friend and former Sussex teammate Ranjitsinhji was offered and accepted the chance to become one of India's three representatives at the newly created League of Nations in Geneva he took Fry with him as his assistant. It was whilst working for Ranjitsinhji at the League of Nations, in Geneva, that Fry claimed to have been offered the throne of Albania. Whether this offer genuinely occurred has been questioned, but Fry was definitely approached about the vacant Albanian throne and therefore seems to have been considered a credible candidate for the post.

He stood (unsuccessfully) as a Liberal candidate for parliament for the Brighton constituency in 1922. Fry's presence certainly brought some welcome glamour and excitement to the election, and his campaign was given extra colour by the appearance, at an election meeting, of Dame Clara Butt, the opera singer (and a close personal friend of the Frys). He won 22,059 votes, 4,785 fewer than the Conservative victor.

He later fought the seat of Banbury in 1923, losing by just 219 votes, and the Oxford by-election in 1924, where he was defeated by 1,842 votes.

Writing, editing, publishing and broadcasting

Books by Fry include:
The Book of Cricket: A New Gallery of Famous Players (1899), editor, appeared in 14 weekly parts.
Giants of the Game: Being Reminiscences of the Stars of Cricket from Daft Down to the Present Day (c. 1900), with R. H. Lyttleton, W. J. Ford & George Giffen.
Great Batsmen: Their Methods at a Glance (1905), with George W Beldam, who provided the photographs.
Great Bowlers and Fielders: Their Methods at a Glance (1907), with George W. Beldam
A Mother's Son (1907), a novel written in collaboration with his wife.
Cricket: Batsmanship (1912).
Key-Book of The League of Nations.
Life Worth Living: Some Phases Of An Englishman (1939), his autobiography.
Cricket on the Green For Club And Village Cricketers And For Boys (1947), with R. S. Young.
 
He is also believed to have written much of The Jubilee Book of Cricket (1897), of which the nominal author was Ranji. He wrote prefaces and introductions for a number of other cricket books, and wrote articles on cricket and football for The Strand Magazine in the early years of the 20th century. In the 1930s, he wrote a column for the London Evening Standard, which covered many topics. The column was credited with a considerable increase in the paper's circulation. He launched and edited C. B. Fry's Magazine.  In his magazine he promoted toys such as the diabolo. A History and Bibliography of Fry's Magazine was published in December 2022 by Sports History Publishing.

His broadcasting career began in 1936 with commentary for the BBC on a match between Middlesex and Surrey. He declined to join the panel on Any Questions but in 1945 began a successful stint on The Brains Trust. 
In 1946 he was one of the BBC radio commentary team for the Tests between England and India. In 1953 he gave a 3-hour interview to the BBC which was edited down to 30 minutes for the programme Frankly Speaking. In 1955, he was surprised by Eamonn Andrews for the fifth episode of the new television show This Is Your Life. Amongst the friends gathered to relive his best moments were Jack Hobbs and Sydney Barnes.

Later life
In the 1920s, Fry's mental health started to deteriorate severely. He had encountered mental health problems earlier in his life, experiencing a breakdown during his final year at Oxford, which meant that, although academically brilliant, he achieved a poor degree. In the late 1920s, he had a major breakdown and became deeply paranoid. He reached breaking point in 1928 during a visit to India, becoming convinced that an Indian had cast a spell on him. For the rest of his life, he dressed in bizarrely unconventional clothes. He did recover enough to become a popular writer on cricket and other sports, and even into his sixties he entertained hopes of becoming a Hollywood star. At one point when he was staying in Brighton he was supposed to have gone for a walk along the beach early in the morning and suddenly shed all his clothes, trotting around stark naked.

In 1934, as reported in his 1939 autobiography, Life Worth Living, he visited Germany with the idea of forging stronger links between the uniformed British youth organisations, such as the Boy Scouts, and the Hitler Youth, so that both groups could learn from each other. Fry met Adolf Hitler who greeted him with a Nazi salute which he returned with a Nazi salute of his own. He failed to persuade von Ribbentrop that Nazi Germany should take up cricket to Test level. Some members of the Hitler Youth were welcomed at TS Mercury, and Fry was still enthusiastic about them in 1938, just prior to the outbreak of war. Fry's laudatory statements about Hitler persisted through his autobiography's third impression in July 1941 but appear to have been purged in the fourth impression (1947).

He retired from his position at TS Mercury in 1950, and died in 1956, in Hampstead, London. The English writer and critic Neville Cardus wrote the following words for Fry's obituary: Fry must be counted among the most fully developed and representative Englishmen of his period; and the question arises whether, had fortune allowed him to concentrate on the things of the mind, not distracted by the lure of cricket, a lure intensified by his increasing mastery over the game, he would not have reached a high altitude in politics or critical literature. But he belonged – and it was his glory – to an age not obsessed by specialism; he was one of the last of the English tradition of the amateur, the connoisseur, and, in the most delightful sense of the word, the dilettante.

His ashes were buried in the graveyard of Repton Parish Church, next to Repton School's Priory. In 2008, his grandson, Jonathan Fry (chairman of the governors at Repton), was in attendance at the rededication of Fry's grave, which was inscribed with, "1872 C B Fry 1956. Cricketer, scholar, athlete, Author – The Ultimate All-rounder'.

Honours
Southampton F.C.
 FA Cup finalist: 1902

Two Brighton & Hove buses (429 and 829) were named "C B Fry" in his honour.

See also
List of English cricket and football players
List of cricket and rugby union players

References

Bibliography

External links

 Charles Fry – biography on the Oxford University Association Football Club web site
 Corinthian Casuals F.C. – Player profiles
 

1872 births
1956 deaths
Alumni of Wadham College, Oxford
Association football fullbacks
Barbarian F.C. players
Blackheath F.C. players
British magazine publishers (people)
British male journalists
British sportsperson-politicians
Burials at St. Wystan's Church, Repton
Corinthian F.C. players
Cricket historians and writers
Cricketers from Greater London
England cricket team selectors
England international footballers
England Test cricket captains
England Test cricketers
English cricket commentators
English cricketers of 1890 to 1918
English cricketers
English footballers
English male long jumpers
English rugby union players
Europeans cricketers
FA Cup Final players
Footballers from Croydon
Gentlemen cricketers
Gentlemen of England cricketers
Gentlemen of the South cricketers
Hampshire cricketers
Liberal Party (UK) parliamentary candidates
London County cricketers
Marylebone Cricket Club cricketers
North v South cricketers
Oxford University A.F.C. players
Oxford University cricketers
Oxford University Past and Present cricketers
Oxford University RFC players
People educated at Repton School
People of the Victorian era
Portsmouth F.C. players
Royal Naval Volunteer Reserve personnel
Royal Navy officers
Rugby union players from Croydon
Southampton F.C. players
Southern Football League players
Sussex cricket captains
Sussex cricketers
Wisden Cricketers of the Year
Wisden Leading Cricketers in the World
Royal Naval Reserve personnel